Calcium release activated channel regulator 2A is a protein that in humans is encoded by the CRACR2A gene.

References

Further reading